Greta Schiller is an American film director and producer, best known for the 1984 documentary Before Stonewall: The Making of a Gay and Lesbian Community.

Personal life
Schiller received the US/UK Fulbright Arts Fellowship in Film and grants from multiple organisations. She is openly lesbian.

Career

Her 1976 film Greta's Girls is, following Barbara Hammer, one of the first independent short films to focus on lesbians.

She had a part directing the 1981 documentary Greetings from Washington, D.C. which details the first important LGBT walk in 1979.

In 1984, Schiller and Andrea Weiss founded Jezebel Productions.  The company emphasizes on educational films based on real people. It is based in New York City, and in London since 1998. Schiller and Weiss were strongly influenced by both the New Left movement and the women's and gay liberation movements of the 1970s.

In 1985, she and Weiss teamed up to direct Before Stonewall, which won two Emmy awards. Before Stonewall was the first gay or lesbian film to be funded by the Corporation for Public Broadcasting. They also directed International Sweethearts of Rhythm (1986), about African American women musicians performing in the 1930s to 1940s; Tiny & Ruby: Hell Divin' Women (1988), and Paris Was a Woman (1996).  Paris Was a Woman, about creative lesbians in 1920s Paris, was a labor of love for the two filmmakers, taking 5 years to produce and breaking house records.

Schiller directed Maxine Sullivan: Love to Be In Love (1990), Woman of the Wolf (1994),  The Man Who Drove With Mandela (1998), I Live At Ground Zero (2002), and The Marion Lake Story: Defeating the Mighty Phragmite (2014). She produced and directed No Dinosaurs in Heaven (2010), about the problem of creationists infiltrating science education.

Films
Before Stonewall combines interviews with multiple forms of media that shows the history of gays and lesbians during the early 20th century to the 1960s.

The Advocate said that Greta Schiller is "gifted".

Time Out New York wrote that Paris Was a Woman might cause viewers to "want to leave their spouse and move to Paris.

The author of Black Popular Culture included a picture from the film Maxine Sullivan: Love to Be In Love on the first page of the book.

The Atlantic Journal wrote that International Sweethearts of Rhythm "makes you glad documentaries were invented."

Awards and nominations
Greta Schiller has won several awards over her career.  Before Stonewall earned her an award at the Torino Gay and Lesbian Film Festival, as well as a Grand Jury Nomination at the Sundance Film Festival.

Tiny and Ruby: Hell Divin' Women earned Schiller a Teddy at the Berlin International Film Festival. She won another Teddy in 1999 for Best Documentary for The Man Who Drove with Mandela.  The film also won Best Documentary at the Milan International Lesbian and Gay Film Festival, and was nominated for Best Documentary at the Newport International Film Festival in Rhode Island.

In 2019, Schiller’s film Before Stonewall was selected by the Library of Congress for preservation in the National Film Registry for being "culturally, historically, or aesthetically significant".

Filmography
 Greta's Girls (1978)
 Greetings from Washington, D.C. (1981)
 Before Stonewall (1984)
 International Sweethearts of Rhythm (1986) 
 Tiny and Ruby: Hell Divin' Women (1989)
 Maxine Sullivan: Love to Be In Love (1990)
 Woman of the Wolf (1994)
 Paris Was a Woman (1996)
 The Man Who Drove with Mandela (1998)
 Seed of Sarah (1998)
 Escape To Life: The Erika and Klaus Mann Story (2000) (directed by Andrea Weiss)
 I Live at Ground Zero (2002)
 U.N. Fever (2008)
 No Dinosaurs in Heaven (2010)
 The Marion Lake Story: Defeating the Mighty Phragmite (2014)
 Bones of Contention (2017)
 The Land of Azaba (2020)

See also
 List of female film and television directors
 List of lesbian filmmakers
 List of LGBT-related films directed by women
 List of LGBT people from New York City

References

Further reading
  (book chapter from LGBTQ America Today: An Encyclopedia (2008))

External links

Jezebel Productions

1954 births
Living people
American documentary filmmakers
American film directors
American film producers
American lesbian artists
LGBT film directors
LGBT producers
LGBT people from Michigan
American women documentary filmmakers
21st-century American women artists